Sinibaldo Ibi was an Italian painter, active in the early 16th century. He probably resided at Gubbio, and was a member of the Guild of Perugia in 1527. In 1507 he painted a Virgin and Child, between SS. Sebastian and Tibaldo. for one of the altar pieces in the Cathedral of Gubbio. One of his followers and contemporary collaborators was Orlando Merlino. In the Civic Art Gallery at Perugia is an Annunciation (1528) by Ibi.

References

People from the Province of Perugia
16th-century Italian painters
Italian male painters
Umbrian painters
Italian Renaissance painters